Bergen is the second-largest city in Norway.

Bergen may also refer to:

Places

Australia
 Bergen, Queensland, a locality in the Toowoomba Region

Belgium
 Bergen, the Dutch name of Mons

Canada
 Bergen, Alberta

Germany
 Bergen, Lower Saxony, in the district of Celle
 Bergen, Saxony, in the Vogtlandkreis, Saxony
 Bergen an der Dumme, in the district of Lüchow-Dannenberg, Lower Saxony
 Bergen auf Rügen, on the island of Rügen
 Bergen, Upper Bavaria
 Bergen, Middle Franconia
 Bergen, Hesse
 Bergen, Neuburg
 Bergen, Rhineland-Palatinate

Netherlands
 Bergen, North Holland
 Bergen aan Zee, part of the municipality of Bergen, North Holland
 Bergen, Limburg
 Bergen op Zoom

United States
 Bergen, Minnesota
 Bergen County, New Jersey
 Bergen Section, Jersey City, New Jersey
 Bergen (town), New York
 Bergen (village), New York
 Bergen, North Dakota
 Bergen, Wisconsin (disambiguation), multiple locations

Locations
 Bergen-Lafayette in Jersey City, New Jersey
 Bergen Point in Bayonne, New Jersey
 Bergen Square in Jersey City, New Jersey
 Bergen Hill
 Bergen Arches
 Bergen Tunnels
 Bergen Street, a station on the New York City Subway

Historical uses
 Bergen, New Netherland
 Bergen City, New Jersey
 Bergen Township, New Jersey (1661–1862)
 Bergen Township, New Jersey (1893–1902)
 Burgin, Kentucky, originally known as Bergen in the 19th century

People 
 Bergen (singer), Turkish singer
 Bergen (name), a surname (including a list of people with the surname)
 Edgar Bergen, a ventriloquist
 Polly Bergen, actress, singer and entrepreneur
 Wendy Bergen

Other uses
 Bergen, a type of backpack used by the British Armed Forces
 Bergen-Belsen concentration camp
 Bergen Shopping Addiction Scale, a 28 item psychological screening tool
 Bergen (domino game), a type of domino game in which points are scored for matching ends of the line of play

Russian Mennonite surnames